Whakatāne District is a territorial authority district on the North Island of New Zealand. The Whakatāne District Council is headquartered in the largest town, Whakatāne. The district falls within the Bay of Plenty Region. Victor Luca has been the mayor of Whakatāne since the 2022 local elections.

The district has an area of 4465 square kilometres, of which 4450 square kilometres are land.

History
A Whakatane County Council was established in 1876, and covered a wider area than the present district, including Ōpōtiki. Whakatane Road Board was established at the same time.

The county was split  into Whakatane and Opotiki counties in 1900, and the Road Board was made part of Whakatane County. In 1913, Whakatane Harbour Board was established, and in 1914, Whakatane Town became a separate entity from Whakatane County. The town became Whakatane Borough in 1917. Kawerau Town and Murupara Town District split in 1954 and 1955, and both became boroughs in 1962.

In 1976, Whakatane County, Whakatane Borough and Whakatane Harbour Board amalgamated to form Whakatane District. This expanded in 1989 by amalgamating with Murupara Borough, and taking parts of Opotiki and Taupo districts.

Demographics

Whakatāne District had a population of 35,700 at the 2018 New Zealand census, an increase of 3,009 people (9.2%) since the 2013 census, and an increase of 2,400 people (7.2%) since the 2006 census. There were 12,468 households, comprising 17,442 males and 18,258 females, giving a sex ratio of 0.96 males per female. The median age was 39.8 years (compared with 37.4 years nationally), with 8,013 people (22.4%) aged under 15 years, 6,177 (17.3%) aged 15 to 29, 15,303 (42.9%) aged 30 to 64, and 6,207 (17.4%) aged 65 or older.

Ethnicities were 63.2% European/Pākehā, 46.8% Māori, 3.0% Pacific peoples, 3.4% Asian, and 1.3% other ethnicities. People may identify with more than one ethnicity.

The percentage of people born overseas was 11.8, compared with 27.1% nationally.

Although some people chose not to answer the census's question about religious affiliation, 48.1% had no religion, 32.9% were Christian, 9.5% had Māori religious beliefs, 0.4% were Hindu, 0.1% were Muslim, 0.3% were Buddhist and 1.3% had other religions.

Of those at least 15 years old, 4,089 (14.8%) people had a bachelor's or higher degree, and 5,925 (21.4%) people had no formal qualifications. The median income was $26,300, compared with $31,800 nationally. 3,792 people (13.7%) earned over $70,000 compared to 17.2% nationally. The employment status of those at least 15 was that 12,303 (44.4%) people were employed full-time, 4,389 (15.9%) were part-time, and 1,587 (5.7%) were unemployed.

Sister cities
  Kamagaya, Chiba, Japan (since 1997)
  Warwick, Queensland, Australia (since 1994)

Whakatāne has a friendship agreement with Shibukawa, Gunma, Japan.

References

External links

 Whakatāne District Council

Whakatane District
Districts of New Zealand